Dolenja Vas can refer to the following locations:

In Croatia:
 Dolenja Vas, Croatia, a village near Lupoglav, Croatia

In Slovenia:
 Dolenja Vas, Cerknica, a settlement in the Municipality of Cerknica
 Dolenja Vas, Divača, a settlement in the Municipality of Divača
 Dolenja Vas, Novo Mesto, a settlement in the Municipality of Novo Mesto
 Dolenja Vas, Podbrezje, a former settlement in the Municipality of Naklo
 Dolenja Vas, Prebold, a settlement in the Municipality of Prebold
 Dolenja Vas, Ribnica, a settlement in the Municipality of Ribnica
 Dolenja Vas, Zagorje ob Savi, a settlement in the Municipality of Zagorje ob Savi
 Dolenja Vas, Železniki, a settlement in the Municipality of Železniki
 Dolenja Vas pri Artičah, a settlement in the Municipality of Brežice
 Dolenja Vas pri Čatežu, a settlement in the Municipality of Trebnje
 Dolenja Vas pri Črnomlju, a settlement in the Municipality of Črnomelj
 Dolenja Vas pri Krškem, a settlement in the Municipality of Krško
 Dolenja Vas pri Mirni Peči, a settlement in the Municipality of Mirna Peč
 Dolenja Vas pri Polhovem Gradcu, a settlement in the Municipality of Dobrova–Polhov Gradec
 Dolenja Vas pri Polici, a settlement in the Municipality of Grosuplje
 Dolenja Vas pri Raki, a settlement in the Municipality of Krško
 Dolenja Vas pri Temenici, a settlement in the Municipality of Ivančna Gorica